Bow and Poplar was a parliamentary constituency in London which returned one Member of Parliament (MP)  to the House of Commons of the Parliament of the United Kingdom.

It was created for the 1983 general election, and abolished for the 1997 general election.

Boundaries 
The Borough of Tower Hamlets wards of Blackwall, Bow, Bromley, East India, Grove, Lansbury, Limehouse, Millwall, Park, and Shadwell.

Members of Parliament

Election results

Elections in the 1980s

Elections in the 1990s

See also 
Poplar and Limehouse (UK Parliament constituency)

Notes and references 

Parliamentary constituencies in London (historic)
Politics of the London Borough of Tower Hamlets
Constituencies of the Parliament of the United Kingdom established in 1983
Constituencies of the Parliament of the United Kingdom disestablished in 1997